Kornstad Church is a parish church of the Church of Norway in Averøy Municipality in Møre og Romsdal county, Norway. It is located in the village of Kornstad on the western coast of the island of Averøya, along the Kornstadfjorden. It is the church for the Kornstad parish which is part of the Ytre Nordmøre prosti (deanery) in the Diocese of Møre. The white, wooden church was built in a long church style in 1871 using plans by the architect Jacob Wilhelm Nordan. The church seats about 350 people.

History
The earliest existing historical records of the church date back to the year 1589, but the church was not new that year. The first church in Kornstad was a stave church likely from the 14th century. The state archives in Trondheim has a record of a mass held at the church on 17 June 1386. Not much is known about the original church. In 1649, the church was enlarged by adding two timber-framed transepts to the north and south sides of the nave to give the building a cruciform floor plan. In 1761, a new tower was built on the roof and two second floor seating galleries for men were built in the nave. In 1812, new exterior supports were erected around the whole church, as all the walls leaned out towards the cemetery.

In 1814, this church served as an election church. Together with more than 300 other parish churches across Norway, it was a polling station for elections to the 1814 Norwegian Constituent Assembly which wrote the Constitution of Norway. This was Norway's first national elections. Each church parish was a constituency that elected people called "electors" who later met together in each county to elect the representatives for the assembly that was to meet in Eidsvoll later that year.

Parts of the new church were constructed in Steinkjer and shipped down to Kornstad. The new church was designed by Jacob Wilhelm Nordan and built by builder Gustav O. Olsen, and it was consecrated in 1871. Many items from the old church were saved and re-used in the present church including the church bells and the two altar candlesticks.

See also
List of churches in Møre

References

Averøy
Churches in Møre og Romsdal
Wooden churches in Norway
Long churches in Norway
19th-century Church of Norway church buildings
Churches completed in 1871
14th-century establishments in Norway
Norwegian election church